Aaptos is a genus of sea sponges in the family Suberitidae.

It was first described by John Edward Gray in 1867.

Species
The following species are recognised in the genus Aaptos:

Aaptos aaptos (Schmidt, 1864)
Aaptos alphiensis Samaai & Gibbons, 2005
Aaptos bergmanni de Laubenfels, 1950
Aaptos ciliata (Wilson, 1925)
Aaptos conferta Kelly-Borges & Bergquist, 1994
Aaptos duchassaingi (Topsent, 1889)
Aaptos durissima (Carter, 1882)
Aaptos globosa Kelly-Borges & Bergquist, 1994
Aaptos glutinans Moraes, 2011
Aaptos hajdui Carvalho, da Silva & Pinheiro, 2013
Aaptos horrida (Carter, 1886)
Aaptos kanuux Lehnert, Hocevar & Stone, 2008
Aaptos laxosuberites (Sollas, 1902)
Aaptos lobata Calcinai, Bastari, Bertolino & Pansini, 2017
Aaptos niger Hoshino, 1981
Aaptos nuda (Kirkpatrick, 1903)
Aaptos papillata (Keller, 1880)
Aaptos pernucleata (Carter, 1870)
Aaptos potiguarensis Carvalho, da Silva & Pinheiro, 2013
Aaptos robustus Plotkin & Janussen, 2008
Aaptos rosacea Kelly-Borges & Bergquist, 1994
Aaptos suberitoides (Brøndsted, 1934)
Aaptos tenta Kelly-Borges & Bergquist, 1994
Aaptos vannamei de Laubenfels, 1935

References